AOV Adult Movie Channel or more commonly referred to as AOV TV is a Canadian exempt English language discretionary specialty channel. It is a premium television channel consisting of explicit feature pornographic films, scheduled by genre specifically for each viewing demographic.  It is owned by Channel Zero Inc. in conjunction with Adults Only Video (a chain of pornographic video retailers in Canada), as well as other investors. AOV programs and operates the service.

AOVTV On Demand
AOV TV also operates a subscription video on demand (VOD) service called AOVTV On Demand. This service offers many of the same films available on AOV TV. It is currently available on MTS and Rogers Cable in Ontario.

See also
 XXX Action Clips Channel
 Maleflixxx Television

References

 AOV - The Vision of Adult, Celebrates; Mediacaster Magazine, 08/25/05.
 Sex Please, We're Canadian; Mediacaster Magazine, 09/01/04.
 Deveau, Scott No sex please, we're Canadian, rules CRTC; The Vancouver Sun, 04/04/07.

External links
  (Note: adult content)

Channel Zero (company)
Canadian pornographic television channels
Television channels and stations established in 2004
Digital cable television networks in Canada
English-language television stations in Canada
Commercial-free television networks
Companies based in Richmond Hill, Ontario